Thomas Jones Yorke (March 25, 1801 – April 4, 1882) was a US Whig Party politician.

Early life and career
He was born at Hancock's Bridge, New Jersey (now part of Lower Alloways Creek Township), in Salem County, New Jersey. During the War of 1812, he served as a scout for the United States forces. He studied law, but did not practice, and engaged in mercantile pursuits at Salem.

He was county collector of Salem County in 1830. Yorke served as judge of the Salem County Court of Common Pleas in 1833, 1834, and 1845–1854 and for a portion of the latter term was presiding judge. He served as a member of the New Jersey General Assembly in 1835.

Congress
He was elected as a Whig to the United States House of Representatives from New Jersey in 1836 and served from March 4, 1837 to March 3, 1839.  He was re-elected to the House in 1838 but the House declined to seat him.  He was elected to the House in 1840 and served from March 4, 1841 to March 3, 1843. He served as chairman, Committee on Expenditures in the Department of the Navy (Twenty-seventh Congress).

After Congress
Yorke served as a director of the West Jersey Railroad Co., serving as secretary and treasurer in 1853 and as president 1866-1875; also president of the Cape May & Millville Railroad Co.; served as director at various times of the Swedesborough Railroad Co., Salem Railroad Co., Camden & Philadelphia Ferry Co., and West Jersey Marl & Transportation Co. He died in Salem, New Jersey on April 4, 1882, and was there interred in St. John's Episcopal Cemetery.

Sources

Thomas Jones Yorke at The Political Graveyard

1801 births
1882 deaths
Politicians from Salem County, New Jersey
New Jersey state court judges
Members of the New Jersey General Assembly
Burials at St. John's Episcopal Cemetery, Salem, New Jersey
Whig Party members of the United States House of Representatives from New Jersey
19th-century American politicians
19th-century American judges